Ar-Rutba District is the largest district by area in Al Anbar Governorate, Iraq, covering 93,445 km2, and the least populated in relative and absolute terms, with a population of 24,813 (estimate January 2003), or 0.27 per km2. It is also the southernmost district of Al Anbar Governorate, the westernmost of the whole country, and the only district nationwide bordering Jordan. It is centred on the town of Ar-Rutba.

Cities
 Al Waleed (Al Walid)
 Ar-Rutbah
 Nukhayb
 Trebil
 Akashat
 Al Habbariyah
 Al Kasrah

References

Districts of Al Anbar Governorate